Caulanthus barnebyi, the Black Rock wild cabbage, is a plant species endemic to a small region in the US State of Nevada. It is known only from the Black Rock Mountains in Humboldt and Pershing Counties in the northwestern part of the state.

Flowers are in a dense raceme, with purple sepals and white petals.

References

barnebyi
Flora of Nevada
Flora without expected TNC conservation status